In Business Africa is a BBC news programme broadcast on BBC World News globally and on local partner channels of the BBC in African countries. The programme is presented by Nancy Kacungira in Lagos, Nigeria and Lerato Mbele in South Africa. The programme gives an indepth look at the economic trends shaping the African continent, with interviews, discussions and informative features about different business topics in Africa.

Presenters

Current

References

External links
 

BBC World News shows
2019 British television series debuts
2020s British television series
British television news shows
Business-related television series in the United Kingdom
English-language television shows